The 2017 Louisville Cardinals football team represented the University of Louisville in the sport of American football during the 2017 NCAA Division I FBS football season. The Cardinals competed in the Atlantic Division of the Atlantic Coast Conference and were led by fourth-year head coach Bobby Petrino, who began his second stint at Louisville in 2014 after eight years away. Home games were played at Papa John's Cardinal Stadium in Louisville, Kentucky. They finished the season 8–5, 4–4 in ACC play to finish in a three-way tie for third place in the Atlantic Division. They were invited to the TaxSlayer Bowl where they lost to Mississippi State.

Schedule

Game summaries

vs Purdue

at North Carolina

Clemson

Kent State

Murray State

at NC State

Boston College

at Florida State

at Wake Forest

Virginia

Syracuse

at Kentucky

vs Mississippi State–Tax Slayer Bowl

Rankings

Roster

2018 NFL Draft

The Cardinals had four players selected in the 2018 NFL draft.

References

Louisville
Louisville Cardinals football seasons
Louisville Cardinals football